Jaffal Rural District is a rural district (dehestan) in the Central District of Shadegan County, Khuzestan Province, Iran. At the 2006 census, its population was 17,849, in 2,889 families.  The rural district has 34 villages.

References 

Rural Districts of Khuzestan Province
Shadegan County